These are the late night Monday-Friday schedules on all three networks for each calendar season beginning September 1955. All times are Eastern and Pacific.

Talk shows are highlighted in yellow, local programming is white.

Schedule 

United States late night network television schedules
1955 in American television
1956 in American television